Helmuth F. "Helly" Orthner (March 27, 1941 – March 16, 2009) was a pioneering American scientist in the field of medical informatics. He was one of the founders of the Symposium on Computer Applications in Medical Care (SCAMC), which later grew into the American Medical Informatics Association. He was a Fellow of the American College of Medical Informatics.

References
 Medical Informatics Loses Pioneer. In Memoriam: Dr. Helmuth Orthner (1941-2009)
 "You Have to Be There" - Twenty-five Years of SCAMC/AMIA Symposia
 Obituary (including Biography) on Legacy.com

Health informaticians
American computer scientists
Technical University of Munich alumni
2009 deaths
1941 births